Once Aboard the Lugger is a 1920 British silent comedy film directed by Gerald Ames and Gaston Quiribet and starring E. Holman Clark, Eileen Dennes and Evan Thomas.

Plot
A hard-up student kidnaps his rich uncle's cat.

Cast
 E. Holman Clark as Mr. Marrapit  
 Eileen Dennes as Mary Humfray  
 Evan Thomas as George  
 Denis Cowles as Bill Wyvern  
 Reginald Bach as Bob Chater  
 Gwynne Herbert as Mrs. Major  
 John MacAndrews as Fletcher  
 Winifred Sadler as Mrs. Chater  
 Frederick Lewis as Vyvian Howard 
 Gerald Ames

References

Bibliography
 Goble, Alan. The Complete Index to Literary Sources in Film. Walter de Gruyter, 1999.

External links

1920 films
1920 comedy films
British silent feature films
British comedy films
Seafaring films
British black-and-white films
Hepworth Pictures films
1920s English-language films
1920s British films
Silent comedy films
Silent adventure films